Kai Smith (born 28 November 2004) is a professional cricketer who has played for Warwickshire County Cricket Club and the United Arab Emirates national under-19 cricket team. He is a right-handed wicket-keeper batsman.

Personal life
Smith was born and raised in Dubai to South African parents. He attended Nord Anglia International School Dubai before moving to boarding school in Kent to complete his A-levels.

Career

UAE
Smith represented the UAE at the 2020 Under-19 Cricket World Cup in South Africa at the age of 15. He returned to the UAE squad for the 2022 Under-19 Cricket World Cup in the West Indies. He scored 145 against Papua New Guinea in a warm-up match.

Smith played for the Rawalpindi Raiders in the 2022 Pakistan Junior League.

England 
Smith was introduced to the Warwickshire County Cricket Club system by Dougie Brown, a former UAE coach. He was selected for the English Schools Cricket Association to play against the Marylebone Cricket Club (MCC) in September 2021. Smith made his List A debut for Warwickshire against Gloucestershire in the 2022 Royal London One-Day Cup in August 2022.

References

2004 births
Living people
Emirati cricketers
Warwickshire cricketers
South African expatriate sportspeople in the United Arab Emirates
Sportspeople from Dubai